Gibberula inopinata is a species of sea snail, a marine gastropod mollusk, in the family Cystiscidae.

References

inopinata
Gastropods described in 1962
Cystiscidae